Davorin "Davo" Karničar (October 26, 1962 – September 16, 2019) was a Slovene alpinist and extreme skier.

As an active mountain skier, Davo was a member of the Yugoslavian national mountain ski team between 1975 and 1982. An alpinist since 1980, he climbed in 1989 to Nanga Parbat in Pakistan and in 1993 to K2, which borders Pakistan and The People's Republic of China. In 1995 he made his first ski descent from Annapurna in Nepal and in 1996 he made a ski descent from Shishapangma in Tibet. By 2010 he had accomplished over 1,500 mountain climbs and ski descents. He was the first person to make a complete ski descent from the Seven Summits, less than one month after the first person, Kit DesLauriers (a woman), skied from the top of all of the seven summits, but did not accomplish complete descents on Everest and Denali. Davo was only 38 years old when he became the first person to ski down from the summit of the highest mountain in the world, Mount Everest, on October 7, 2000.

His Seven Summits descents were:

 Mount Everest (8848 m) in Asia on October 7, 2000
 Kilimanjaro (5895 m) in Africa in November 2001
 Mount Elbrus (5642 m) in Europe in May 2002
 Aconcagua (6960 m) in South America in January 2003
 Mount Kosciuszko (2228 m) in Australia in August 2003
 Denali (6194 m) in North America in June 2004
 Vinson Massif (4897 m) in Antarctica on November 11, 2006

The other significant peaks he skied from include the north-east face of Eiger and the east face of Matterhorn in Switzerland and Mont Blanc, the highest peak in Alps in the border between Italy and France. In February 2001, he guided the first ski school for Nepalese children on the Khumbu Glacier in Nepal.

See also
List of 20th-century summiters of Mount Everest

References

1962 births
2019 deaths
Slovenian mountain climbers
People from the Municipality of Jezersko
Seven Summits
Summiters of the Seven Summits